Tamarikidō Hideki (born April 19, 1974) is a former sumo wrestler born in Edogawa, Tokyo, Japan. Though born in Japan, he is a Zainichi Korean and a member of Mindan. His highest rank was maegashira 8. A former amateur champion, he turned professional in 1997, reaching the top makuuchi division in 2001. He had many injury problems throughout his career, missing over 100 matches, and last fought in makuuchi in 2003. He announced his retirement in January 2010.

Career
He was born in Edogawa, Tokyo, and is a third generation Korean-Japanese. He was a teammate of Takanohana at the Meidai Nakano High School's sumo club. He was also a former amateur sumo champion at Meiji University, and was considered extremely promising. He came third in the All Japan Sumo Championships. He made his professional debut in March 1997 at the bottom of the third makushita division. He was a runner-up in his first tournament but had a few setbacks before finally reaching the second highest jūryō division in September 1999.

Tamarikidō made his debut in the top makuuchi division in January 2001. He has spent eleven tournaments in the top division in total, the last in November 2003 when he had to withdraw after winning only two bouts. 2004 was a disastrous year for him as a knee injury in May meant he missed nearly all his matches and fell to the fourth sandanme division. It was subsequently discovered that due to the lack of treatment of earlier injuries, his anterior cruciate ligament was completely worn away. He began his comeback in 2005, winning the sandanme division championship in March of that year.

He eventually managed to return to the jūryō division in March 2006, and having fallen to sandanme 80, he was the lowest ranking former top division wrestler ever to regain sekitori status. He had climbed as high as jūryō 4 by the November 2006 tournament. However, he was demoted back to the unsalaried ranks after the September 2007 tournament when he managed only a 3–12 score at jūryō 12. He continued to slide down the rankings, with four consecutive make-koshi scores of 3–4 from November 2007 to May 2008. After recording only one win in November 2008  he was demoted back to the sandanme division for the January 2009 tournament. He made an immediate return to the third division with a 6–1 score.

Retirement from sumo
Tamarikidō retired after the January 2010 tournament, with a final day defeat to Kitazakura leaving him with a 1–6 record. His danpatsu-shiki, or retirement ceremony, was held in June at the Ryōgoku Kokugikan. He  stayed in sumo as a coach at Kataonami stable under the toshiyori name Araiso Oyakata. In June 2013 he switched to the Nishonoseki name after it was vacated by the retiring stablemaster Kongō. In 2014 he swapped elder names with Matsugane Oyakata, the former ōzeki Wakashimazu, and joined the renamed Nishonoseki stable.

In August 2020 it was announced that he had tested positive for COVID-19, although he had not been displaying symptoms and was not believed to have been in close contact with other sumo personnel during the most recent tournament.

Fighting style
Tamarikidō preferred to fight on the opponent's mawashi, and his favoured grip was (somewhat unusually) morozashi, or double hand inside. His most common winning kimarite was yori-kiri, a straightforward force out.

Career record

See also
Glossary of sumo terms
List of sumo tournament second division champions
List of past sumo wrestlers
List of sumo elders

References

External links
 

1974 births
Living people
Japanese people of Korean descent
Japanese sumo wrestlers 
People from Edogawa, Tokyo
Sumo people from Tokyo
Zainichi Korean people
Meiji University alumni